Victoria Regina is an American historical drama television film that aired on NBC on November 30, 1961, as part of the anthology series Hallmark Hall of Fame. The production, covering 60 years in the life of Queen Victoria, was nominated for seven Primetime Emmy Awards, winning Program of the Year, Outstanding Single Performance by an Actress in a Leading Role (for Julie Harris), and Outstanding Performance in a Supporting Role by an Actress (for Pamela Brown).

Plot
The production depicts the life of Great Britain's Queen Victoria through vignettes starting with her accession to the throne at age 18, covering her romance with Prince Albert, and ending with her time as an elderly widow at age 78.

Cast
The actors noted in the opening credits were:
 Julie Harris as Queen Victoria
 James Donald as Prince Albert
 Felix Aylmer as Lord Melbourne
 Pamela Brown as Duchess of Kent, Victoria's mother
 Isabel Jeans as mistress of the robes
 Barry Jones as the Dean
 Basil Rathbone as Lord Beaconsfield
 Inga Swenson as Lady Jane

Production
Victoria Regina was based on Laurence Housman's play of the same name, which ran on Broadway in the 1930s with Helen Hayes in the title role. Robert Hartung adapted Housman's play for television. George Schaefer served as producer and director.

One of the film's challenges was to have Harris believably age by 60 years from age 18 to age 78. NBC makeup artist Bob O'Bradovich used a combination of makeup and various devices, including a rubber mask and false nose to achieve the effect. One reviewer noted that the devices were a debit to the production, as Harris seemed "barely animated" behind the layers of latex.

The film aired on NBC on November 30, 1961, as part of the Hallmark Hall of Fame series.

Reception

Reviews
In The New York Times, Jack Gould described Harris' performance as impeccable, magnificent, inspired, touching, and "a work of flowing ecstasy and poignancy." Gould also credited Robert O'Bradovich with a triumph for his makeup work.

In the Los Angeles Times, Cecil Smith called it "a rich and delicately woven tapestry that gave television its most rewarding 90 minutes of the season." For special honors, he called out Harris ("a superb performance"), Warren Clymer (scenery), and Noel Taylor (costumes).

Cynthia Lowry of the Associated Press wrote that it was "beautifully produced" and "meticulously performed". However, partly due to the shadow cast by Helen Hayes who played the role in the original stage production, Lowry opined that Harris "never was convincing as the great imperious queen".

Fred Danzig of the UPI wrote: "Beautiful, beautiful acting. Sensible and sensitive direction by George Schaefer. And my compliments to Miss Harris's makeup man – 60 years from start to finish – was accomplished with impressive skill." Danzig also praised writer Robert Hartung for improving upon the original play.

In January 1962, Percy Shain of The Boston Globe selected Victoria Regina as television's best drama of 1961, noting that it was a "fairly easy" pick.

Emmy Awards
The production was nominated for seven Primetime Emmy Awards, winning three: Program of the Year, Outstanding Single Performance by an Actress in a Leading Role (for Harris), and Outstanding Performance in a Supporting Role by an Actress (for Brown). Additional nominations included Outstanding Single Performance by an Actor in a Leading Role for James Donald and Outstanding Performance in a Supporting Role by an Actor for Barry Jones.

References

External links
 

1961 television films
1961 films
1961 drama films
1960s biographical drama films
1960s historical drama films
American biographical drama films
American films based on plays
American historical drama films
Biographical television films
Cultural depictions of Queen Victoria on film
Cultural depictions of Queen Victoria on television
American drama television films
Emmy Award-winning programs
Films set in the 19th century
Hallmark Hall of Fame episodes
Historical television films
Films directed by George Schaefer
1960s English-language films
1960s American films